While submarines were invented centuries ago, development of self-propelled torpedoes in the latter half of the 19th century dramatically increased the effectiveness of military submarines.

Initial submarine scouting patrols against surface warships sank several cruisers in the first month of World War I. Incidental submarine encounters with merchant ships were handled by signalling ships to stop, then sinking them after evacuation of the crew, in accordance with international law. After unrestricted submarine warfare began in February 1915, any ship could unexpectedly sink rapidly from the heavy underwater hull damage inflicted by torpedoes. Many large ships sank without their crews being able to alert friendly forces in time, and the submarines which sank them were too small to rescue more than a few survivors.

Heavy personnel casualties continued through World War II, and there have been a few later sinkings.

List of ships sunk by submarines by death tolls exceeding 150

References

Ships sunk by submarines by death toll
Ships sunk by submarines